Uriel "Uri" Davis (born 8 June 1943 in Jerusalem) is an academic and civil rights activist. Davis has served as Vice-Chairman of the Israeli League for Human and Civil Rights and as lecturer in Peace Studies at the University of Bradford. Davis describes himself as "a Palestinian Hebrew national of Jewish origin, anti-Zionist, registered as Muslim and a citizen of an apartheid state - the State of Israel." A member of Fatah since 1984, he was elected to the Revolutionary Council for the Palestinian party in 2009.

Background and education
Uri Davis was born in Jerusalem and grew up in and was educated in Kfar Shmaryahu. His parents were Jewish immigrants who had come to Mandatory Palestine during the Fifth Aliyah. His mother Blanka was from Czechoslovakia and his father Joseph was from the United Kingdom. Davis describes himself as a Palestinian Hebrew. During the 1961-1963 period he worked on Kibbutz Erez as an alternative form of national service to military conscription. Subsequently, he received a BA in Philosophy and Arabic from the Hebrew University of Jerusalem (1968), a Masters in Philosophy from the same institution (1970) and from The New School for Social Research, New York City an MA in Anthropology (1973) and a PhD in Anthropology (1976).

Career
Davis was appointed to a position in the University of Bradford's Department of Peace Studies by Professor Adam Curle soon after the Department's founding in 1973. He is an honorary research fellow at the University of Durham's Institute for Middle Eastern and Islamic Studies (IMEIS) and at the University of Exeter's Institute of Arab and Islamic Studies (IAIS). He currently divides his residence between the predominantly Arab city of Sakhnin in northern Israel and the mixed city of Ramle in central Israel. In  2009, Uri Davis was appointed to teach a course at the Palestinian Al-Quds university on critical Israeli studies.

Apartheid comparisons

Davis wrote a series of books and articles that classify the State of Israel as an apartheid state, alleging that Israel's policies towards Palestinians, including Palestinian citizens of Israel, are comparable to South Africa's apartheid policies: Israel: An Apartheid State (1987), Apartheid Israel: A Critical Reading of the Draft Permanent Agreement, known as the "Geneva Accords" (2003), and Apartheid Israel: Possibilities for the Struggle Within (2003).

In an interview to Irish Times in 2002 Davis said: "I am an anti-militarist and recognise the right to use force in certain instances, in armed resistance, which is legal in international law. It allows armed resistance, the targeting of the opposite party in uniform."

Activism
He is a founding member of The Movement Against Israeli Apartheid in Palestine (MAIAP) and of Al-Beit The Association for the Defense of Human Rights in Israel, and a former member of the Executive Committee of the Council for the Advancement of Arab-British Understanding (CAABU) and of the Editorial Board of RETURN magazine.. A member of Academia for Equality, an organization working to promote democratization, equality and access to higher education for all communities living in Israel.

Revolutionary Council election
Until 2009 Davis was Observer Member of the Palestine National Council.
In 2009, Davis was successful in his bid for a seat on Fatah's Revolutionary Council, a legislative body of the Movement, placing 31st from among more than 600 candidates running for position in the 128-member body. He is the first person of Jewish origin to be elected to such a high-ranking position. He was re-elected in 2016, taking the 29th place.

2008 marriage and conversion to Islam
Davis met Miyassar Abu Ali, a Palestinian, in Ramallah in 2006. They signed their Certificate of Marriage ('Aqd al-Zawaj) there in 2008, after Davis converted to Islam at their marriage.

Selected bibliography
 Dissent & Ideology in Israel: Resistance to the Draft 1948-1973 (as co-editor, with Martin Blatt and Paul Kleinbaum) (1975) 
 Documents from Israel, 1967-73: Readings for a Critique of Zionism (as co-editor, with Norton Mezvinsky) (1975) 
 Israel & the Palestinians (as co-editor, with Andrew Mack and Nira Yuval-Davis) (1975) 
 Israel: Utopia Incorporated - A Study of Class, State and Corporate Kin Control (1977) 
 Deir al-Asad: The Destiny of an Arab Village in Galilee, in Palestinian Arabs in Israel: Two Case Studies, Ithaca Press, London 1977, (as co-editor, with Hasan Amun, and Nasr Dakhlallah San´Allah) 
 Towards a Socialist Republic of Palestine (as co-editor, with Fouzi el-Asmar and Naïm Khader) (1978) 
 Debate on Palestine (as co-editor, with Fouzi el-Asmar and Naïm Khader) (1981) 
 Israel: An Apartheid State (1987) 
 The Jewish National Fund (with Walter Lehn) (1988) 
 The State of Palestine (Jerusalem Study Series) (1991) 
 Crossing the Border: an autobiography of an Anti-Zionist Palestinian Jew (1995) 
 Citizenship and the State: A Comparative Study of Citizenship Legislation in Israel, Jordan, Palestine, Syria and Lebanon (London, 1997) 
 Citizenship and the State in the Middle East: Approaches and Applications (as co-editor) (Syracuse, New York, 2000) 
 Apartheid Israel: Possibilities for the Struggle Within (2004)

See also
Uri Avnery
Adam Keller

References

External links
 Uri Davis' website
 Movement Against Israeli Apartheid in Palestine official website 

Articles, selected
An Exchange on Israel and the Palestinians 10 February 1972, New York Review of Books,
 March 1990, Return
Citizenship legislation in the Syrian Arab Republic, in Arab Studies Quarterly (ASQ),  Winter, 1996
Just an ordinary Sakhnin day , October 2001 (about Sakhnin)
Jews! Stand Up and Be Counted! , 11 April 2002,
Martin Buber's Paths in Utopia The Kibbutz: an experiment that didn't fail? issue 2446 March–June 2002, Peace News,
 issue 93,  4 June 2002  Information Brief,
Apartheid Israel issue 655 11 September 2003,   Al-Ahram Weekly,  
Apartheid Israel: A Critical Reading of the Draft Permanent Agreement, known as the 'Geneva Accords' , 6 December 2003
Research Report on the Subject of the British Park funded by the Jewish National Fund UK (First draft) , June 2004 (about Ajjur)
Regarding the Gush Shalom statement on the Jewish National Fund , 28 January 2005
Rejoinder to David Newman and Benjamin Pogrund  30 May 2005

Interview
, by Uri Davis and Jon Elmer; FromOccupiedPalestine.org; September 19, 2004

1943 births
Academics of the University of Bradford
Academics of the University of Exeter
Converts to Islam from Judaism
Fatah members
Israeli people of Czech-Jewish descent
Israeli people of British-Jewish descent
Israeli Muslims
Jewish anti-Zionism in the United Kingdom
Living people
Hebrew University of Jerusalem alumni
Palestinian people of European descent
Palestinian people of Jewish descent
Palestinian Muslims
Peace and conflict scholars
People from Jerusalem
The New School alumni
Anti-Zionism in Israel